Arnold Leibovit (born June 18, 1950) is an American director, producer, and screenwriter of feature films and musical productions. An acting member of the Producers Guild of America, he has produced, directed, and written several feature films. As part of his career, he has devoted over 40 years to the work of George Pal. Included is the production of the George Pal biopic  The Fantasy Film Worlds of George Pal, for which he received a CINE Golden Eagle Award in the Arts category in 1986 and The George Pal Memorial Award (also known as the Saturn Award) from The Academy of Science Fiction Fantasy and Horror Films in 1987. In addition, he produced other works focusing on Pal including The Puppetoon Movie.

In 2002 he served as the executive producer for The Time Machine. Leibovit had earlier obtained the rights to the H.G. Wells book and the 1960 MGM motion picture through the George Pal estate. This film was produced under the direction of Wells' great-grandson Simon Wells.

Arnold Leibovit was born and raised in south Florida, a child of Hungarian ancestry. George Pal was also Hungarian and had fled from Germany to Holland and then to the United States as Hitler was beginning his reign in Europe. Leibovit became interested in Pal and his movies and, as he embarked on his career in filmmaking, Pal rose to the top of his interests. In 1985, he produced the first and only filmed documentary of the life of George Pal.

Selected filmography
 (1975) Penny Lane (writer, director)
 (1980) Rascal Dazzle (associate director, editor)
 (1985) The Fantasy Film Worlds of George Pal (writer, director, producer)
 (1987) The Puppetoon Movie (writer, director, producer)
 (2002) The Time Machine (executive producer)

References

External links 
 
Arnold Leibovit on THE FANTASY FILM WORLDS OF GEORGE PAL
Arnold Leibovit on THE PUPPETOON MOVIE

1950 births
Living people
American animated film directors
English-language film directors
Film directors from Florida
People from Miami Beach, Florida
Historians of animation